The inferior gluteal veins are venae comitantes of the inferior gluteal artery. They commence in the superior/proximal posterior thigh. They enter the pelvis through the lower part of the greater sciatic foramen. They converge to form a single vessel before emptying into the into the distal portion of the internal iliac vein.

Anatomy

Anastomoses 
At their origin, the inferior gluteal veins form anastomoses with the medial femoral circumflex vein and the first perforating veins. They provide a means of collateral circulation between the femoral vein, and lnternal iliac vein.

References

Veins of the torso